Kirsty Hay (born 9 February 1972 in Glasgow, Scotland as Kirsty Addison) is a Scottish curler, a two-time  (1992, 1995) and a three-time Scottish women's champion (1995, 1996, 1998).

She played for Great Britain at the 1998 Winter Olympics, where the British team finished in fourth place.

This was the first occasion that a Scottish women's team had ever held a world title in curling.

Awards
Frances Brodie Award: 1996
 All-Star Team, Women:

Teams

Personal life
Her sister Karen Addison is also a curler. They won the  together.

She began curling at the age of 12.

References

External links

1972 births
Living people
British female curlers
Curlers at the 1998 Winter Olympics
Curlers from Glasgow
Olympic curlers of Great Britain
Scottish curling champions
Scottish female curlers